Sturmtruppen is a 1976 comedy film directed by Salvatore Samperi. It is based on the homonymous Sturmtruppen comic books created by Bonvi.

Cast 
Renato Pozzetto as Rookie
Lino Toffolo as Rookie
Cochi Ponzoni as General
Teo Teocoli as Captain
Felice Andreasi as Sergeant / The Pope
Massimo Boldi as Rookie
Corinne Cléry as The Actress, The Wife, The Woman at the Villa
Jean-Pierre Marielle as The Unknown Soldier
Umberto Smaila as The Cook
Bonvi as The Prisoner

Production
Strumtruppen is a film based on a comic book series written by Bonvi about the conflict in the trenches of World War II  from the point of view of the German army. The comic series originally appeared in 1968. The idea to adapt Bonvi's scripts to a film came from producers Ermanno Donati and Luigi Carpentieri who had recently produced another popular Italian production set in World War II, Salon Kitty. The two got in touch with Bonvi through screenwriter Vittorio Vighi.

Filming was initially set to start in June 1976. The project eventually went through several different stages as Donati and Carpentieri were not convinced by the original director Ennio De Concini's vision of the film. The script was originally written by Vittorio Vighi and Maria Pia Fusco but these parts were dropped and director Salvatore Samperi signed as the director. De Concini later spoke about his involvement in Strumtruppen, stating that he "felt that my relationship with cinema was running out. [...] I did not feeling like doing [Strumptruppen]. I would have made a  bad job and a bad movie."

Release
Sturmtruppen was released in Italy in 1976. The film was a big box office hit in Italy, grossing over a one billion lire at the box office. The film's success led to a sequel  which was written by Bonvi and again directed by Samperi.

See also
 List of films based on comics
 List of Italian films of 1976

References

Footnotes

Sources

External links

1976 films
1976 comedy films
Films directed by Salvatore Samperi
Italian comedy films
French comedy films
Films based on comic strips
Military humor in film
Italian World War II films
Films based on Italian comics
Live-action films based on comics
1970s Italian films
1970s French films
French World War II films